Morteza (Mory) Gharib (born December 9, 1952) is the Hans W. Liepmann Professor of Aeronautics and Bio-Inspired Engineering at Caltech.

Gharib was elected a member of the National Academy of Engineering in 2015 for contributions to fluid flow diagnostics and imagery, and engineering of bioinspired devices and phenomena.

Research
Professor Gharib's research interests cover a range of topics in conventional fluid dynamics and aeronautics. These include vortex dynamics, active and passive flow control, nano/micro fluid dynamics, bio-inspired wind and hydro energy harvesting, as well as advanced flow imaging diagnostics.

In addition, Professor Gharib is heavily involved in the bio-mechanics and medical engineering fields. His research activities in these fields can be categorized into two main areas: the fluid dynamics of physiological machines (such as the human circulatory system and aquatic breathing/ propulsion), and the development of medical devices (such as heart valves, cardiovascular health monitoring devices, and drug delivery systems).

Awards and honors
Professor Gharib is the recipient of the 2016 G. I. Taylor Medal from the Society of Engineering Science and he received the American Physical Society's Fluid Dynamics award in 2015. He's a Member of the American Academy of Arts and Sciences and the National Academy of Engineering; and he's a Fellow (Charter) of the National Academy of Inventors, the American Association for the Advancement of Science, the American Physical Society, the American Society of Mechanical Engineering and the International Academy of Medical and Biological Engineering.

References

American people of Iranian descent
American mechanical engineers
Fluid dynamicists
Iranian expatriate academics
Living people
California Institute of Technology alumni
1952 births
Fellows of the American Physical Society